Stig Hvalryg (born 15 July 1960 in Oslo, Norway) is a Norwegian jazz musician (upright bass), known from several orchestras and recordings, and a profile on the Oslo Jazz scene in recent years.

Career 
He plays within Bodil Niska Quartet, "Rickard Badendyck Quartet", in "Willy Andresen Quartet", "Frode Thingnæs Quartet", "Michael Block Trio", "Tore Sandnæs Trio", with Inge Stangvik/Eivin Sannes, as well as within the Eivin Sannes "Dexter Gordon Project". He has participated in releases by Per Høglend Quintet album Psychiatri Meets Jazz(2001) and Per Høglend Septett album Mind And Music (2003), Ingar Kristansen's The Sinatra songbook (2001), Anne Landes Largoland (2005) and Per Husby/Anne Lande's Sakte sanger.
 
Together with Sture Janson, Jens Fossum and Kåre Garnes he played within "Fire bassister", who performed the tribute to Erik Amundsen in 2006. At "Oslo Jazzfestival" 2006 he joined the quartet of Majken Christiansen in "Tribute to Ella Fitzgerald". He also performed with David Arthur Skinner and Bjørn Vidar Solli in the Diagonal Jazzband and David Skinner og Bjørn Vidar Solli Quartet, among others at Lancelot in Asker, Norway and Swing'n'Sweet Jazzklubb in Bergen, Norway.

Discography (in selection) 
2001: The Sinatra Songbook, with Ingar Kristansen
2001: Psychiatri Meets Jazz, within Per Høglend Quintet
2003: Mind And Music, within Per Høglend Septett
2004: That's All (Jazzavdelingen), with Richard Badendyck
2005: Largoland (Park Grammofon), with Anne Lande
2006: Sakte Sanger (Park Grammofon), with Anne Lande & Per Husby
2007: Comes Love (Park Grammofon), with Majken Christiansen
2008: Nora – For Swingende!!! (Park Grammofon), with Nora Brockstedt
2010: Peace (BadenMusic), with Richard Badendyck
2011: A Day at The Opera (Ponca Jazz Records), with Antonsen, Hvalryg, Olstad Trio

References

External links
Stig Hvalryg on Groove.no

1960 births
Living people
Norwegian jazz upright-bassists
Male double-bassists
Jazz double-bassists
Norwegian jazz composers
Male jazz composers
Ponca Jazz Records artists
Musicians from Oslo
21st-century double-bassists
21st-century Norwegian male musicians